Pedro Gabriel Pereira Lopes (born 10 November 1999), commonly known as Pedrinho, is a Brazilian professional footballer who plays as a forward for São Paulo, on loan from Russian club Lokomotiv Moscow.

Club career
Born in São Paulo, Pedrinho joined Audax after impressing in an evaluation at the club's affiliated side Grêmio Osasco. He made his senior debut on 23 July 2017, aged only 17, coming on as a second-half substitute in a 1–1 Copa Paulista home draw against Rio Branco-SP.

Pedrinho joined Oeste in August 2017, on loan until December 2018. He made his professional debut for the club on 7 October, replacing Betinho in a 3–0 home defeat of Guarani for the Série B championship.

Pedrinho became a regular starter during the 2018 season, and scored his first senior goal on 17 March in a 1–0 Campeonato Paulista Série A2 away win against Batatais. After helping his side achieve promotion to Campeonato Paulista, he was also a regular starter in the Série B, scoring five goals as his side narrowly avoided relegation.

Pedrinho returned to Audax for the 2019 campaign, but was bought outright by Oeste in February, signing a contract until 2024. On 7 May 2019, Pedrinho was loaned out to Athletico Paranaense, initially playing for the U23 team.

On 8 September 2022, Pedrinho signed a four-year, €5 million, contract with Lokomotiv Moscow in Russia. Pedrinho was not allowed to have his common name printed on his Lokomotiv Moscow shirt, because it sounds similar to a Russian homophobic pejorative.

On 28 September 2022, Pedrinho scored his first goals for Lokomotiv, netting 4 goals in a 5–0 Russian Cup victory over FC Khimki.

On 7 December 2022, Lokomotiv announced that Pedrinho will move on a 1-year loan to São Paulo, effective 1 January 2023.

Career statistics

References

External links
Pedrinho profile at Federação Paulista de Futebol 
Oeste FC profile 

1999 births
Footballers from São Paulo
Living people
Brazilian footballers
Association football forwards
Grêmio Osasco Audax Esporte Clube players
Oeste Futebol Clube players
Club Athletico Paranaense players
Red Bull Bragantino players
América Futebol Clube (MG) players
FC Lokomotiv Moscow players
São Paulo FC players
Campeonato Brasileiro Série A players
Campeonato Brasileiro Série B players
Russian Premier League players
Brazilian expatriate footballers
Expatriate footballers in Russia
Brazilian expatriate sportspeople in Russia